Cubanycteris is an extinct genus of bat containing a single species, C. silvai.

Cubanycteris belongs to the subfamily Stenodermatinae. Fossil specimens were found in a cave in Cueva Geda, Pinar del Río, Cuba.

References

Prehistoric bats
Fossils of Cuba
Phyllostomidae